Polypedates macrotis, commonly known as the dark-eared treefrog, sometimes also Bongao tree frog, Bongao bubble-nest frog, Baram whipping frog, or brown-striped tree frog, is a species of frog in the family Rhacophoridae. It is found in the central peninsular Thailand (requiring confirmation), Sumatra, Borneo, and Sulu Archipelago as well as a range of other Philippine islands (Palawan, Busuanga, Calauit, Jolo, and Dumaran).

"Bongao" in the common name refers to Bongao Island, the type locality of Philautus montanus, now synonymized with Polypedates macrotis. On the other hand, "Baram", a district in Sarawak, is the type locality of Polypedates macrotis.

Description
Dorsum is brown with a darker band behind the eye that covers the tympanum, tapering along the side.

Polypedates macrotis is similar to Polypedates leucomystax but differs from it slightly in colouration and body proportions.

Reproduction
Polypedates macrotis deposit their eggs in foam nests attached to leaves or twigs overhanging standing water, such as ponds and ditches.

Habitat
It is a locally abundant species inhabiting primary forests and edge areas. Adults can be found near small streams, swaps, ponds, puddles, or small pools.

Gallery

References

macrotis
Amphibians of Brunei
Amphibians of Indonesia
Amphibians of Malaysia
Amphibians of the Philippines
Amphibians of Thailand
Amphibians of Borneo
Fauna of Sumatra
Amphibians described in 1891
Taxa named by George Albert Boulenger
Taxonomy articles created by Polbot